The following is a list of notable machinima-related events in 2007.

Events
January 31 – Phil Rice's work Male Restroom Etiquette, made with the Electronic Arts games The Sims 2 and SimCity 4, was showcased in Animation World Network's Best of the Web 2007.
February 24 – February 25 – The Australian Centre for the Moving Image hosted a machinima film festival, presented by the Academy of Machinima Arts & Sciences.
October 12 – October 14 – The first Machinima Festival Europe was held in Leicester.
October 24 – ILL Clan as part of the Electric Sheep Company produced 20 minutes of machinima shown during an episode of CSI: NY entitled "Down the Rabbit Hole", made within the virtual world of Second Life.

Notable releases

February 9 – The Heretic premiered.
May 18 – The Heretic ended with episode 7.
May 19 – The release of episode 4 of This Spartan Life was completed.
June 28 – Red vs. Blue Season Five ended with episode 100.
December 3 - Freeman's Mind premiered.

Active series

1-800-Magic (2007)
The Heretic (2007)
Neverending Nights (premiered 2004)
Red vs. Blue (2003–2007)
Red vs. Blue: Recovery One (2007)
This Spartan Life (premiered 2005)

Notes

References

Machinima
Machinima by year